Kermit Lynch (born December 1941 Bakersfield, California)  is an American wine importer and author based in Berkeley, California. He is the author of Adventures on the Wine Route, which won the Veuve Clicquot Wine Book of the Year award, as well as Inspiring Thirst. He also co-owns Domaine Les Pallières in Gigondas along with the Brunier family of Domaine du Vieux Télégraphe in Châteauneuf-du-Pape.

He is married to photographer Gail Skoff, whose photographs illustrate his books.

Career
Richard Olney introduced Lynch to many French wine growers, including Lucien and Lulu Peyraud of Domaine Tempier, who were then re-establishing the Bandol AOC as a vineyard area of the first rank.

Awards and honors 
Lynch is a winner of the James Beard Foundation's Wine Professional of the Year award. The Chevalier de l'Ordre de Mérite Agricole medal was presented to him by the French government for his service to the wine industry. In 2005 he was awarded the insignia of Chevalier de la Legion d'Honneur by the French government.

Benefits of wine on label advocacy

In the late 1980s and early 1990s, Lynch took objection to a regulation of the Bureau of Alcohol, Tobacco, and Firearms that required wine bottles to be labeled with the Surgeon General's warning against alcohol consumption but prohibited any countering sentiment about the benefits of moderate wine drinking to be on the label.

On numerous occasions, Lynch petitioned the ATF to allow him to add a statement about the benefit of wine to go with the Surgeon General's warning such as quotes by Louis Pasteur on the hygienic properties of wine, the Bible on wine's healing properties, and Thomas Jefferson on the pleasures that drinking wine can bring. After many trials, Lynch finally had his request approved.

Refrigerated containers 

Lynch was a pioneer in the wine industry for his use of refrigerated shipping containers to prevent wines from being ruined by heat during shipping. Since most European wines arrive to the West Coast of the United States via the Panama Canal and Mexican coast, heat damage was common as the cargo could spend months at sea in a hot metal container. After noticing that wines imported from Burgundy tasted different than he remembered at the winery, Lynch began experimenting with refrigerated containers and found that the problem was eliminated. This became a standard practice.

Published works
Adventures on the Wine Route: A Wine Buyer's Tour of France, Farrar, Straus and Giroux, New York, 1988
25th Anniversary Edition of Adventures on the Wine Route: A Wine Buyer's Tour of France, Farrar, Straus and Giroux, New York, 2013
Inspiring Thirst: Vintage Selections from the Kermit Lynch Wine Brochure, Ten Speed Press, Berkeley, 2004

See also
List of wine personalities

References

External links
 

Writers from Berkeley, California
Living people
People from Bakersfield, California
Businesspeople from Berkeley, California
1941 births
Chevaliers of the Légion d'honneur
Knights of the Order of Agricultural Merit
James Beard Foundation Award winners